Nathan Lane (born Joseph Lane; February 3, 1956) is an American actor. In a career spanning over 40 years he has been seen on stage and screen in roles both comedic and dramatic. Lane has received numerous awards including three Tony Awards, an Olivier Award, three Emmy Awards, and a Screen Actors Guild Award. In 2006, Lane received a star on the Hollywood Walk of Fame, and was inducted into the American Theater Hall of Fame in 2008. In 2010, The New York Times hailed Lane as "the greatest stage entertainer of the decade". 

Lane made his professional theatre debut in 1978 in an off-Broadway production of A Midsummer Night's Dream. During this time he also briefly appeared as one half of the comedy team of Stack and Lane, until he was cast in the 1982 Broadway revival of Noël Coward's Present Laughter directed by and starring George C. Scott. This led to an extensive career onstage, where he had a long friendship and fruitful collaboration with the playwright Terrence McNally which started in 1989 with the Manhattan Theater Club production of The Lisbon Traviata. 

A six time Tony Award nominee, Lane has won three times portraying Pseudolus in Stephen Sondheim's A Funny Thing Happened on the Way to the Forum (1996), Max Bialystock in Mel Brooks' The Producers (2001), and Roy Cohn in Tony Kushner's Angels in America (2018). His other Tony-nominated roles were for Guys and Dolls (1992), The Nance (2013), and The Front Page (2016).

He made his film debut in Ironweed (1987), and has starred in over 35 films, including The Birdcage (1996), Mouse Hunt (1997), and The Producers (2005). He also voiced the wise-cracking meerkat, Timon in The Lion King (1994), and Snowbell the cat in Stuart Little. He received the Primetime Emmy Award for Outstanding Guest Actor in a Comedy Series for the Hulu series Only Murders in the Building in 2022 after a record-breaking seven nominations in the guest actor category. His Emmy-nominated roles also include Frasier, Mad About You, Modern Family, and The Good Wife. Other television credits include The People v. O. J. Simpson: American Crime Story (2016), Penny Dreadful: City of Angels (2020), and The Gilded Age (2022).

Early life
Nathan Lane was born Joseph Lane in Jersey City, New Jersey, on February 3, 1956. His father, Daniel Joseph Lane, was a truck driver and an aspiring tenor who died in 1967 from alcoholism when Lane was eleven. His mother, Nora Veronica (Finnerty), was a housewife and secretary who suffered from bipolar disorder and died in 2000. He has two older brothers, Daniel Jr. and Robert. Lane's parents were Catholics, and all of his grandparents were Irish immigrants. He was named after his uncle, a Jesuit priest. Lane attended Catholic schools in Jersey City, including Jesuit-run St. Peter's Preparatory School, where he was voted Best Actor in 1974, and years later received the 2011 Prep Hall of Fame Professional Achievement Award.

Career

1980s 
Accepted to Saint Joseph's University in Philadelphia on a drama scholarship, he was accompanied on what was supposed to be his first day there by his older brother Dan. Discovering that the scholarship would not cover enough of his expenses, he decided to leave, and work for a year to earn some money. His brother said, "I remember him saying to me, 'College is for people who don't know what they want to do.'" Because there already was a Joseph Lane registered with Actors' Equity, he changed his name to Nathan after the character Nathan Detroit from the musical Guys and Dolls. He moved to New York City where, after a long struggle, his career began to take off, first with some brief success in the world of stand-up comedy with partner Patrick Stack, and later with Off-Broadway productions at Second Stage Theatre, the Roundabout Theatre, and the Manhattan Theatre Club. He made his Broadway debut in a 1982 revival of Noël Coward's Present Laughter as Roland Maule (Drama Desk nomination) with George C. Scott, Kate Burton, Dana Ivey, Bette Henritze, Elizabeth Hubbard, Jim Piddock, and Christine Lahti.

His second Broadway appearance was in the 1983 musical Merlin, starring Chita Rivera and magician Doug Henning. This was followed by Wind in the Willows as Mr. Toad, Some Americans Abroad at Lincoln Center, and the national tour of Neil Simon's Broadway Bound.

Off-Broadway productions included Love (the musical version of Murray Schisgal's Luv), Measure for Measure directed by Joseph Papp in Central Park, for which he received the St. Clair Bayfield Award, The Common Pursuit, The Film Society, In a Pig's Valise, She Stoops to Conquer,  The Merry Wives of Windsor and A Midsummer Night's Dream.  He also appeared at the Williamstown Theatre Festival in The School for Scandal and John Guare's Moon Over Miami.

1990s

In 1991, Lane appeared with George C. Scott again in a revival of Paul Osborne's On Borrowed Time at the Circle in the Square Theatre on Broadway. In 1992, he starred in the hit revival of Guys and Dolls, playing Nathan Detroit, the character who lent him his name, opposite Peter Gallagher and Faith Prince. For this performance, he received his first Tony nomination, as well as Drama Desk and Outer Critics Circle Awards.  In 1992, he won an Obie Award for Sustained Excellence of Performance.

His professional association with his close friend the playwright Terrence McNally, whom he met in 1987, includes roles in The Lisbon Traviata (Drama Desk and Lucille Lortel Awards, and Outer Critics Circle nomination), Bad Habits, Lips Together, Teeth Apart, Love! Valour! Compassion! (Obie, Drama Desk, and Outer Critics Circle Awards), Dedication or the Stuff of Dreams, which opened in 2005 (Drama Desk nomination), The Last Mile on PBS Great Performances, and the film version of Frankie and Johnny.

The early 1990s began a stretch of successful Broadway shows for Lane. In 1993, he portrayed Sid Caesar-like Max Prince in Neil Simon's Laughter on the 23rd Floor, inspired by Simon's early career writing sketches for Your Show of Shows.  In 1996, he starred in the hit revival of A Funny Thing Happened on the Way to the Forum, for which he won the Tony, Drama Desk and Outer Critics Circle Awards. In 1998, he appeared Off-Broadway in Jon Robin Baitz's revised 1984 comedy, Mizlansky/Zilinsky or 'Schmucks'.

His association with Stephen Sondheim began with the workshop of Assassins. in 1989. In 1999, he appeared with Victor Garber in the workshop of Wise Guys (later retitled Road Show). His collaboration with Sondheim continued when Lane revised the original book for and starred in the Broadway debut of the composer's The Frogs at Lincoln Center in 2004. The Sondheim song, "Little Dream," in the film The Birdcage, for which Lane received his first Golden Globe nomination, was supposedly written especially for him. The film, an American remake of the classic French farce La Cage aux Folles, was directed by Mike Nichols with a screenplay by Elaine May, and starred Robin Williams, Lane, and Gene Hackman, and went on to be a big success. This was followed by the dark comedy Mouse Hunt, one of the first films to come out of the newly formed DreamWorks Studios, in which he co-starred with British comedian Lee Evans and Christopher Walken.

In 1994, Lane voiced Timon, the meerkat, in Disney's blockbuster animated film The Lion King and reprised the role in its sequels. In 1995, Lane voiced the meerkat in the early episodes of Timon & Pumbaa. In 1995, he played the Cowardly Lion in The Wizard of Oz in Concert at Lincoln Center to benefit the Children's Defense Fund. The performance was originally broadcast on Turner Network Television (TNT). In 1999, he appeared in the Encores! concert revival of Do Re Mi at City Center. That same year he also voiced the role of Snowbell in the family film Stuart Little, opposite his Life With Mikey co-star Michael J. Fox. He is known for his voice work in two Disney animated series, Teacher's Pet and Timon & Pumbaa, as well as George and Martha on HBO. He received Daytime Emmy Awards for Teacher's Pet and Timon and Pumbaa and a nomination for George and Martha. He has hosted Saturday Night Live and The Tony Awards (once as host for the 50th anniversary telecast, and three times as co-host, with Glenn Close and Gregory Hines; Rosie O'Donnell; and Matthew Broderick respectively).

2000s
Lane starred in the Roundabout revival of The Man Who Came to Dinner as Sheridan Whiteside, with Jean Smart and Harriet Harris in 2000.

In 2001, he starred as Max Bialystock in the blockbuster musical version of Mel Brooks's The Producers, a role that earned him his second Tony as well as Drama Desk and Outer Critics Circle Awards. The following year he would go on to reprise his role as Snowbell in Stuart Little 2. He then appeared as Vincent Crummles in a film adaptation of Nicholas Nickleby, for which the cast received the Ensemble Acting award from the National Board of Review. In 2004, he replaced Richard Dreyfuss in The Producers in the West End. Dreyfuss was let go just a week before the show's first preview at London's Theatre Royal Drury Lane. Lane went on to win the Olivier Award as Best Actor in a Musical.  His performance in the film version, opposite Broadway co-star, Matthew Broderick as Leo Bloom, earned him his second Golden Globe nomination for Best Performance by an Actor in a Motion Picture, Musical or Comedy. In 2003 he starred Off-Broadway in Trumbo: Red, White, and Blacklisted.

In 2005, Lane rejoined Broderick for a successful limited run of The Odd Couple. In 2006, he took on a primarily dramatic role in a revival of Simon Gray's Butley, having played the role to great success at The Huntington Theater in Boston in 2003. He and Broderick received adjacent stars on the Hollywood Walk of Fame in a joint ceremony on January 9, 2006, and were immortalized in wax as Max and Leo at Madame Tussauds Museum in New York City on January 16, 2009. In 2008, he played the President of the United States in the David Mamet political satire, November, directed by Joe Mantello. This was followed by the critically acclaimed 2009 revival of Waiting for Godot (Outer Critics Circle nomination) in which he played Estragon opposite Bill Irwin's Vladimir. He was a 2008 American Theatre Hall of Fame inductee.

2010s
In 2009, Lane starred in the musical version of The Addams Family as Gomez (Drama Desk and Outer Critics Circle nominations). That year he also received a Drama League Award for Distinguished Achievement in Musical Theater. Committed to starring in a revival of the Eugene O'Neill play The Iceman Cometh at Chicago's Goodman Theatre in 2012, Lane assumed the role of Hickey, with Brian Dennehy playing the role of Larry Slade in a production directed by the Goodman's Artistic Director, Robert Falls.  Receiving rave reviews, it won six Jeff Awards, including Best Ensemble, Director, and Production, and is the most successful play to date in the theater's history.  In the spring of 2013, Lane returned to Broadway in The Nance, a Lincoln Center production of a new play by Douglas Carter Beane that was directed by Jack O'Brien. For this performance, he received Tony and Drama Desk Award nominations and won the Outer Critics Circle Award and the 2013 Drama League Award for Distinguished Performance. The play aired on PBS Live From Lincoln Center in 2014.

In autumn 2014, he appeared in an all-star ensemble of Terrence McNally's revised and updated It's Only a Play, with F. Murray Abraham, Matthew Broderick, Stockard Channing, Rupert Grint, Megan Mullally, and Micah Stock. The show became one of the biggest hits of the season. In February 2015 he reprised the role of Hickey in the Robert Falls production of The Iceman Cometh to great acclaim at the Brooklyn Academy of Music. He later returned to the Broadway run of It's Only a Play. In 2015, he received the Eugene O' Neill Theater Center Monte Cristo Award for his body of work. In March 2016, he opened the play White Rabbit, Red Rabbit Off-Broadway. In fall of 2016, he returned to Broadway to rave reviews in an all-star revival of Hecht and MacArthur's The Front Page, directed by Jack O'Brien and produced by Scott Rudin. He played the ruthless editor Walter Burns opposite John Slattery as Hildy Johnson and John Goodman as Sheriff Hartman, for which he received Tony, Drama Desk and Outer Critics Circle award nominations. Following that he played Roy Cohn with Andrew Garfield as Prior Walter in the revival of Angels in America, directed by Marianne Elliott at the Lyttlelton Theatre of the National Theatre of Great Britain. Lane reprised his acclaimed portrayal on Broadway at the Neil Simon Theatre, and won the Tony, Drama Desk, and Outer Critics Circle Awards for Best Featured Actor in a Play.

In March 2019, Lane starred in Taylor Mac's absurdist black comedy Gary: A Sequel to Titus Andronicus at the Booth Theatre directed by George C. Wolfe, which received seven Tony Award nominations including Best Play. It was his 24th Broadway show.

Lane has received seven Emmy Award nominations for his guest appearances on Frasier, Mad About You, Modern Family, The Good Wife and Only Murders in the Building for which he finally won. He has also made appearances on Miami Vice, The Days and Nights of Molly Dodd, Sex and the City, Curb Your Enthusiasm, Absolutely Fabulous, 30 Rock, Difficult People and The Blacklist.
 
Lane played F. Lee Bailey in The People v. O. J. Simpson: American Crime Story, the first season of American Crime Story, which premiered on the FX channel in February 2016. It received 22 Emmy nominations and went on to win the Primetime Emmy Award for Outstanding Limited Series. He played the role of Lewis Michener on Showtime's Penny Dreadful: City Of Angels which premiered April 26, 2020 and ran for one season. He has recurring roles in the Hulu series, Only Murders in the Building, starring Steve Martin and Martin Short receiving a Primetime Emmy Award for Outstanding Guest Actor in a Comedy Series. This is Lane's first Primetime Emmy Award for after a record-breaking seven nominations in the guest actor category, making him the most nominated guest actor in Emmy history. He also plays the recurring role of Ward McAllister in the HBO period series, The Gilded Age, written by Julian Fellowes.

2020s 
Lane is co-starring in Ari Aster's upcoming A24 film, Beau Is Afraid alongside Joaquin Phoenix, Amy Ryan and Patti LuPone. He is also co-starring in another A24 film, Fucking Identical Twins, directed by Larry Charles and written by Aaron Jackson and Josh Sharp based on their Upright Citizens Brigade musical stage show which is a twisted take on The Parent Trap. Jackson and Sharp will play the twins with Lane and Megan Mullally as the parents. It also stars Bowen Yang and Megan Thee Stallion. He will also be part of the voice cast for Spellbound, a new animated film from Skydance.

In 2023, Lane returned to the Broadway stage, marking his 25th Broadway show, in Pictures From Home, a play adapted from the photo memoir by Larry Sultan. The production is directed by Bartlett Sher and is also starring Danny Burstein and Zoë Wanamaker at the Studio 54 theatre.

Acting credits 

Lane has had an extensive career in film, television and the theatre. He has appeared in such films as The Lion King (1994), The Birdcage (1996), Mouse Hunt (1997), Nicholas Nickleby (2002), and the film adaptation of the Broadway musical The Producers (2005). He is also known for numerous guest roles including Frasier, Mad About You, 30 Rock, Absolutely Fabulous, Curb Your Enthusiasm, The Blacklist and recurring roles on Modern Family and The Good Wife. He has also received critical praise for his roles as F. Lee Bailey in the limited series The People v. O.J. Simpson (2016) and in the 2020 Showtime series Penny Dreadful: City of Angels as Det. Lewis Michener.  His roles in theatre range from musical comedies, Guys and Dolls (1992), A Funny Thing Happened on the Way to the Forum (1996), and The Producers (2001) to dramatic roles in the work of Terrence McNally, Jon Robin Baitz, and Simon Gray, as well as revivals and new plays such as November (2008), Waiting for Godot (2009), The Nance (2013), It's Only a Play and The Iceman Cometh (2015), The Front Page (2016), Angels in America (2018) and Gary: A Sequel to Titus Andronicus (2019).

Awards and honors 

Lane has received six Tony Award nominations for his work on Broadway winning three times for A Funny Thing Happened on the Way to the Forum (1996), The Producers (2001), and Angels in America (2018). Also for his work in theatre he has received six Drama Desk Awards, six Outer Critics Circle Awards, two Obies, the Lucille Lortel Award, the Drama League Award for Outstanding Achievement in Musical Theater, the Drama League Award for Distinguished Performance for The Nance, the Theatre World John Willis Award for Lifetime Achievement in the Theater, the Eugene O'Neill Monte Cristo Award, the  New Dramatists Career Achievement Award, the Sir Peter Ustinov Comedy Award, and the Laurence Olivier Award.

Lane has received two Golden Globe Award nominations for The Birdcage and The Producers, the National Board of Review Award for Ensemble Acting for Nicholas Nickleby and two Screen Actors Guild Award nominations for Supporting Actor and for Outstanding Performance by a Cast which they won for The Birdcage. For his work on television Lane has received seven Primetime Emmy Award nominations for his work in guest starring roles on Frasier, Mad About You, Modern Family, and The Good Wife and won for Only Murders in the Building. He has received two Daytime Emmy Awards for his voice work in Timon & Pumbaa and Teacher's Pet, as well as a nomination for George and Martha for HBO. He has also received the People's Choice Award for Favorite New Actor in a Comedy and an American Comedy Award for The Birdcage and a nomination for Jeffrey.

Personal life
Lane says that when he told his mother at age 21 that he was gay, she said, "I'd rather you were dead", to which he replied, "I knew you'd understand." He then joked that "Once I got her head out of the oven, everything went fine."

Lane came out publicly in 1999 after the killing of Matthew Shepard, and has been a long-time board member of and fundraiser for Broadway Cares/Equity Fights AIDS. He was honored with the Human Rights Campaign Equality Award, the Gay & Lesbian Alliance Against Defamation Vito Russo Award, The Trevor Project Hero Award, and the Matthew Shepard Foundation Making A Difference Award for his work in the LGBT community in 2015.

Lane has made several critical statements against Republican Party figures. He jokingly compared Paul Ryan to the Wicked Witch of the West, due to Ryan's lack of support for Medicaid. In a 2018 interview about playing Roy Cohn in the Broadway revival of Angels in America, Lane accused Donald Trump of being a liar, stating: "Really, what you learn is what [Trump] learned from Roy Cohn: There are certain tactics that are very familiar, that Trump picked up from him. You know, always go on the attack. The counterattack. Hit the accuser ten times harder and deflect. Never admit defeat. And outright lying if all else fails." Lane was an active supporter of Hillary Clinton and Barack Obama, hosting fundraisers for the Democratic Party.

On November 17, 2015, he married his partner of then 18 years, theater producer and writer Devlin Elliott. They reside in Manhattan and East Hampton.

See also
 LGBT culture in New York City
 List of LGBT people from New York City

References

External links

 
 
 
 
 
 
 
 

1956 births
Living people
20th-century American male actors
21st-century American male actors
American male film actors
American male musical theatre actors
American male stage actors
American male television actors
American male voice actors
American male Shakespearean actors
American gay actors
LGBT people from New Jersey
Daytime Emmy Award winners
Drama Desk Award winners
Primetime Emmy Award winners
Tony Award winners
Obie Award recipients
Laurence Olivier Award winners
Outstanding Performance by a Cast in a Motion Picture Screen Actors Guild Award winners
American LGBT rights activists
St. Peter's Preparatory School alumni
Male actors from Jersey City, New Jersey